Wayne Ferreira and Yevgeny Kafelnikov were the defending champions but did not compete that year.

Arnaud Clément and Sébastien Grosjean won in the final 6–3, 4–6, 7–5 against Wayne Black and Kevin Ullyett.

Seeds

Draw

Finals

Top half

Bottom half

References
 2004 Pacific Life Open Men's Doubles Draw

2004 Pacific Life Open
Doubles